Liberty is a town in Waldo County, Maine, United States. The population was 934 at the 2020 census.

Geography
The largest water body in the town is St. George Lake. Other bodies of water include: Stevens Pond (339 acres), Trues Pon (173 acres), Little Pond (69 acres), Cargill Pond (57 acres) and Colby Pond (26 acres). Liberty is served by Maine State Routes SR 3, SR 220 and SR173. It is bordered on the north by Montville, on the east by Searsmont, on the southeast by Appleton, on the southwest by Washington and on the west by Palermo.

Liberty is home to Lake St. George State Park.

Demographics

2010 census
The racial makeup of the town was 97.3% White, 0.2% African American, 0.7% Native American, 0.1% Pacific Islander, 0.1% from other races, and 1.6% from two or more races. Hispanic or Latino of any race were 0.4% of the population.

There were 395 households, of which 26.1% had children under the age of 18 living with them, 50.9% were married couples living together, 9.1% had a female householder with no husband present, 5.6% had a male householder with no wife present, and 34.4% were non-families. 29.4% of all households were made up of individuals, and 9.4% had someone living alone who was 65 years of age or older. The average household size was 2.31 and the average family size was 2.83.

The median age in the town was 47.2 years. 21.7% of residents were under the age of 18; 5.4% were between the ages of 18 and 24; 20.1% were from 25 to 44; 38.2% were from 45 to 64; and 14.7% were 65 years of age or older. The gender makeup of the town was 51.5% male and 48.5% female.

History 
The midcoast area of Maine was inhabited by coastal and woodland Native Americans such as the Abenaki (or Wabanaki) until they were mostly dislocated by Europeans beginning in the 17th century.

The first European (English) people moved into the area in and around Liberty in the late 18th century. The first settlement was then known as Davistown Plantation, which is incorporated into neighboring Montville in the early 19th century. Mills in Liberty produced materials that were used in the shipbuilding industry that thrived in nearby coastal towns, such as Waldoboro, during the early 19th century.

In 1827 Liberty separated from Montville and was incorporated as a town.

The middle to late 19th century saw a decline in population and goods produced. This correlates with the decline of the shipbuilding industry.

Notable people

 Susan Longley, state legislator

References

Further reading
Hurwitz, Alfred. History of Liberty, Maine, 1827–1975. Liberty, Maine,
Liberty Historical Soc., Thorndike, Maine, Hutchins Brothers, c1975.
Liberty Maine Historical Committee.  The town of Liberty: bits history  and  geography.
N. White. Thorndike, Maine, c1927.

External links
Town of Liberty official website
The Davistown Museum Davistown History Project
Liberty Library
Lake St. George State Park
Walker School
 Maine Genealogy: Liberty, Waldo County, Maine
Liberty Village Facebook page
Liberty Lakes Association (C.A.L.L.)

Towns in Waldo County, Maine
1827 establishments in Maine
Populated places established in 1827
Towns in Maine